Convent de Sant Domènec de Girona was founded in 1253 in the city of Girona by Berenguer de Castellbisbal of the Dominican Order. It is a Bienes de Interés Cultural landmark.

See also 
 List of Bienes de Interés Cultural in the Province of Girona

References 

Gran Enciclopedia Catalana (ed.). «Sant Domènec de Girona». l'Enciclopèdia. Barcelona. (in Catalan)
Diari Oficial de la Generalitat de Catalunya, 8 July 1985, Decret 143/1985 de 30 de maig pel qual es declara monument històrico-artístic de caràcter nacional el Convent de Sant Domènec, a Girona. (in Catalan)
Generalitat de Catalunya. «Convent de Sant Domènec». (in Catalan)

External links 
 
 Convent de Sant Domènec de Girona. at Monestirs de Catalunya. (in Catalan)

Buildings and structures in Girona
Gothic architecture in Catalonia
Dominican monasteries in Spain
13th-century architecture
Bien de Interés Cultural landmarks in the Province of Girona